The following is a non-definitive list of the all-time highest-grossing film producers. The list is not adjusted for inflation.

Worldwide

See also
 Lists of highest-grossing films

References

Film box office
highest